Robert B. Ford is an American businessman and the thirteenth chief executive officer at Abbott Laboratories, a publicly-traded medical devices and health care company based in Abbott Park, Illinois.

Career
Ford joined Abbott in 1996 within its diabetes care business, later heading the company's medical device businesses, and Abbott's integration of St. Jude Medical in 2017, its largest acquisition at the time. He was named President and COO in October 2018.

On March 31, 2020, Ford became the chief executive officer of Abbott Laboratories, elected unanimously by the company's board. He stated that the sale of medical devices such as FreeStyle Libre and diagnostics would be prioritized while CEO as well as developing technology to monitor consumer health through smartphones and other connected devices. 

At the beginning of the COVID-19 pandemic, Ford led the company's COVID-19 testing development and distribution. He pulled Abbott's scientists and manufacturing teams off their projects to work on four teams, each focused on specific tests. The company introduced its first two tests in March 2020 and delivered more than 400 million in 2020. Ford said he considers Abbott's BinaxNOW test to be a model, setting a trend for rapid point-of-care testing after the coronavirus pandemic for ailments such as influenza, sexually transmitted diseases, and hepatitis. In April 2020, Chief Executive recognized Ford for Abbott's response to accessibility for testing.

On December 10, 2021, Ford was elected as chairman of the board for Abbott.

References

Living people
Year of birth missing (living people)
Haas School of Business alumni
Boston College alumni
Abbott Laboratories people
American chief executives